The European Liberal Social Democracy, was a social-democratic political party in Italy. It was initially founded as an internal faction of the Italian Democratic Socialist Party on 10 December 1994 by Enrico Ferri and Luigi Preti to defend themselves from attacks within the party. Ferri was forced to resign as secretary after his alliance decision with the centre-right coalition was strongly disputed within the party and causes the PSDI to be suspended by the Socialist International.

In the XXIV congress, held from 28 to 29 January 1995, Gian Franco Schietroma was appointed secretary of the PSDI, which was readmitted into the Socialist International; instead Ferri and Preti decided to left the PSDI and SOLE became an autonomous party, with a collocation in the centre-right coalition. Under the leadership of Ferri, the party began a collaboration with the Christian Democratic Centre (UDC) that was not agreed by Preti, who in turn decided to leave the party to found Social Democratic Rebirth, which instead federated with Forza Italia. SOLE finally dissolved into the UDC during 1996.

References

Political parties established in 1995
Political parties disestablished in 1996
Defunct social democratic parties in Italy
Defunct political parties in Italy
1995 establishments in Italy
1996 disestablishments in Italy